Acraea buschbecki is a butterfly in the family Nymphalidae. It is found from Cameroon to the western, central and southern parts of the Democratic Republic of the Congo.

Description

A. buschbecki Dew. (57 a). Forewing black above, with the same red spots as in orina, but with the stripe in 1 b divided by a black spot in the middle and the cell with an elongate black spot; the spot in 3 is small and placed in or behind the middle of the cellule; under surface as above, but spots 3-6 yellow instead of red and the marginal band striped with yellow. Hindwing above red to the base with black dots, or somewhat darkened at the base, at the distal margin with sharply defined marginal band about 2 mm. in breadth, beneath with yellow ground-colour and black marginal band, which encloses two small yellow dots in each cellule. Cameroons to the Congo; rare.

Taxonomy
It is a member of the Acraea circeis species group- but see also Pierre & Bernaud, 2014

References

External links

 Die Gross-Schmetterlinge der Erde 13: Die Afrikanischen Tagfalter. Plate XIII 57 a

Butterflies described in 1889
buschbecki
Butterflies of Africa
Taxa named by Hermann Dewitz